CPI Group may refer to:
 China Power Investment Corporation, a Chinese utility company
 CPI International, a US electronics company
 , a Czech real estate company
 CPI Property Group, real estate developer based in Luxembourg
 CPI SAS, Europes largest book manufacturer, a subsidiary of Impala SAS